Richard C. Lounsberry (February 21, 1916 – January 30, 2000) was an American politician who served in the New York State Assembly from the Tioga district from 1953 to 1965.

He died on January 30, 2000, in Sayre, Pennsylvania at age 83.

References

1916 births
2000 deaths
Republican Party members of the New York State Assembly
20th-century American politicians